Fran García may refer to:

 Fran García (footballer, born 1992), Spanish football leftback
 Fran García (footballer, born 1999), Spanish football leftback

See also
Francisco García (disambiguation)